Quararibea turbinata, also known as the swizzlestick tree, is an aromatic plant native to such Caribbean locales as Antigua, Barbados, Dominica, Grenada, Guadeloupe, Hispaniola, Martinique, Montserrat, Netherlands Antilles, Puerto Rico, St. Kitts and Nevis, St. Lucia, Saint Vincent and the Grenadines and the Virgin Islands.  It is generally described as a perennial tree or shrub and its common name comes from its use as a swizzle stick and its association with cocktails such as the Rum Swizzle.

References

Sources
 Acevedo-Rodríguez, P. et al.  1996. Flora of St. John, U.S. Virgin Islands. Mem. New York Bot. Gard. 78:1-581.
 Boggan, J. et al. 1997. Checklist of the plants of the Guianas, ed. 2. 
 Gooding, E. G. et al. 1965. Flora of Barbados. 
 Howard, R. 1974–1989. Flora of the Lesser Antilles.
 Liogier, H. A. & L. F. Martorell. 1982. Flora of Puerto Rico and adjacent islands: a systematic synopsis. 
 Liogier, H. A. 1984–. Descriptive flora of Puerto Rico and adjacent islands.
 Moscoso, R. M. 1943. Catalogus florae domingensis.
 Pulle, A. A. et al., eds. 1932–. Flora of Suriname.

turbinata
Flora of the Caribbean
Flora without expected TNC conservation status